The Azurio tuskfish (Choerodon azurio) also known as the scarbreast tuskfin, is a species of wrasse native to the western Pacific, where it occurs off the coasts of eastern Asia. It can be found in the aquarium trade. It is threatened by overfishing and habitat loss; it is a popular target for spearfishers and is considered an excellent food fish.

References

Azurio tuskfish
Marine fauna of East Asia
Taxa named by David Starr Jordan 
Taxonomy articles created by Polbot
Azurio tuskfish